Gorzewo may refer to the following places:
Gorzewo, Oborniki County in Greater Poland Voivodeship (west-central Poland)
Gorzewo, Gostynin County in Masovian Voivodeship (east-central Poland)
Gorzewo, Sierpc County in Masovian Voivodeship (east-central Poland)
Gorzewo, Wągrowiec County in Greater Poland Voivodeship (west-central Poland)